Blidberg Rothchild Company was a shipping company founded by Allan Blidberg and Sylvester Rothschild in New York City, United States. The shipping company has is start with a previous company Blidberg and Sagen Company founded by Tryggve Sagen and Allan Blidberg. Tryggve Sagen owned a ship in Oslo, Norway before coming to the United States in 1919. Sylvester Rothschild was born in 1896 in Sweden, he was a finance officer in Gothenburg. Rothschild came to America in 1919 and started the shipping company with Sagen.  Blidberg and Sagen Company had shipping routes from New York to Scandinavian and Baltic ports. Sagen was president, Blidberg vice president and Sylvester Rothschild was the Secretary for the shipping company. Sylvester Rothschild was from Gothenburg Sweden, were he was the Vice-consul. In the 1930s Tryggve Sagen departed the company and the firm was renamed Blidberg Rothchild Company. The company had offices in Gothenburg and Norway. Blidberg Rothchild Company worked with an affiliated company Eastport Steamship Co of New York. Blidberg Rothchild Company also worked with an affiliated company Bridgeport Steamship Line of New York, a New Haven Railroad company.

World War II
During World War II Blidberg Rothchild Company operated Merchant navy ships for the United States Shipping Board. During World War II BBlidberg Rothchild Company was active with charter shipping with the Maritime Commission and War Shipping Administration. Blidberg Rothchild Company operated Liberty ships, Victory ships and tankers for the merchant navy. The ship was run by its Blidberg Rothchild Company crew and the US Navy supplied United States Navy Armed Guards to man the deck guns and radio.

Ships

Ships operated by Blidberg Rothchild Company:
Eastport, built by the Germans in 1937 
Opie Read a ET1-S-C3 tanker. An Armadillo class tanker Tanker.
Liberty ships:
 R. P. Warner  
 SS Roy James Cole  
 SS William P. Duval  
 Simon Benson  
 U.S.O.
 Joseph-Augustin Chevalier  
 SS Julius Rosenwald   
SS A. J. Cermak
SS William Cox
 Lawrence J. Brengle  
 Lee S. Overman       12.11.44 Mined and sunk off Le Havre, France.
 Brandon Victory  
 Walter Frederick Kraft  
 William Cox  
 Bert Williams (2)  
 Andrew W. Preston  
 George S. Boutwell  
 Opie Read  
 Elijah Kellogg    27.6.52 Stranded outside Karachi harbor, broke in two and sank.
 Harry Kirby  
 Francis A. Retka  
 SS John W. Griffiths
 James B. Aswell  
Victory ships:
 Hood Victory  (troopship)  
 Wellesley Victory

See also

Calmar Steamship Company
Bethlehem Transportation Corporation
World War II United States Merchant Navy

References 

Defunct shipping companies of the United States
Transport companies established in 1920
American companies established in 1920
1920 establishments in New York (state)